Dedicated to the Moon is debut album by Italian singer Spagna, released in 1987 the CBS record label. It featured the European hits "Easy Lady" and "Call Me".

Overview
The singer's debut album, which was recorded mostly in the spring of 1987, contains songs sung in English. The singles "Easy Lady" and "Call Me" both became top 10 hits throughout Europe between 1986 and 1987. The songs "Dance Dance Dance", "Dedicated to the Moon" and "Sarah" were also released as singles in various territories. Dedicated to the Moon sold in excess of 500,000 copies.

In 2010, a remastered edition of the CD was released with 6 additional tracks.

Track listing

Charts

Sales and certifications

References

External links
 

1987 debut albums
CBS Records albums